Eileen Díaz (born 1 November 1979) is a Puerto Rican gymnast. She competed in five events at the 1996 Summer Olympics.

References

1979 births
Living people
Puerto Rican female artistic gymnasts
Olympic gymnasts of Puerto Rico
Gymnasts at the 1996 Summer Olympics
Place of birth missing (living people)
20th-century Puerto Rican women